CLG Cill Chomáin is a Gaelic football club located in Kilcommon in north-western County Mayo. The club colours are white and black.

History

Cill Chomáin won the Mayo Junior Football Championship in 2005 and 2012, beating Castlebar Bs and Ardnaree respectively.

Cill Chomáin reached the Mayo Junior County Semi final in 2020 where they were beaten by Kilmaine

References

Gaelic football clubs in County Mayo
Gaelic games clubs in County Mayo